Phong Nha Cave is a cave in Phong Nha-Kẻ Bàng National Park, a UNESCO World Heritage Site in Quảng Bình Province, Vietnam. It is 7,729 metres long and contains 14 grottoes, as well as a 13,969 metre underground river. While scientists have surveyed 44.5 kilometres of passages, tourists are only allowed to explore the first 1500 metres.

Climate 
The climate at Phong Nha Cave is cool and pleasant, sometimes with heavy rain.

See also
Phong Nha cave, from which the name to the whole system and the park is derived, is famous for its rock formations which have been given names such as the “Lion”, the “Fairy Caves”, the “Royal Court”, and the “Buddha”. Phong Nha cave is 7729 m long but tourists can only penetrate to a distance of 1500 m.and contains several grottoes or chamber, including the Bi Ky grottoes.

Its cave system features underground passageways and river caves filled with stalactites and stalagmites. The stalagmites that used to stand at the cave's entrance apparently inspired its name: Phong                                            Nha means ‘Wind and Teeth’.

Phong Nha is famous for its rock formation that bear intriguing names such as the ‘Lion’, ‘Unicorn’, ‘Kneeling elephant’ and ‘the Buddha’. After flowing about 19 km underground, the Son river emerges from the mouth of this cave, draining a huge area of the limestone mountains around Phong Nha.

Phong Nha has been voted as one of the most wonderful caves in the world for a number of reasons: for its longest underground river, for its most beautiful underground lake. for its highest and widest entrance, for its most beautiful and widest dry cave, for its most beautiful sandbank and reef, as well as for its most spectacular stalactites, stalagmites and longest water grottos.
Hang Sơn Đoòng
Hang Én

External links
Phong Nha Cave in Phong Nha-Ke Bang National Park
Phong Nha Cave
UNESCO 951
Phong Nha-Kẻ Bàng National Park Official Website

Caves of Vietnam
Landforms of Quảng Bình province
Show caves in Vietnam
Tourist attractions in Quảng Bình province